Palicoidea is a superfamily of crabs, comprising the two families Crossotonotidae and Palicidae. Together, they contain 13 genera, including two genera in the Palicidae known only from fossils. The two families were previously treated as two subfamilies in a Palicidae of wider circumscription.
Family Crossotonotidae Moosa & Serène, 1981
Crossotonotus A. Milne-Edwards, 1873
Pleurophricus A. Milne-Edwards, 1873
Family Palicidae Bouvier, 1898
Eopalicus † Beschin, Busulini, De Angeli & Tessier, 1996
Exopalicus Castro, 2000
Miropalicus Castro, 2000
Neopalicus Moosa & Serène, 1981
Palicoides Moosa & Serène, 1981
Paliculus Castro, 2000
Palicus Philippi, 1838
Parapalicus Moosa & Serène, 1981
Pseudopalicus Moosa & Serène, 1981
Rectopalicus Castro, 2000
Spinipalicus † Beschin & De Angeli, 2003

References

Crabs
Taxa named by Eugène Louis Bouvier
Arthropod superfamilies